The men's shot put event at the 1932 Olympic Games took place July 31. 15 athletes from 10 nations competed. The 1930 Olympic Congress in Berlin had reduced the limit from 4 athletes per NOC to 3 athletes. Leo Sexton of the United States won the gold medal, the nation's third consecutive and eighth overall victory in the men's shot put. It was also the third consecutive year the Americans took the top two places (including a full medal sweep in 1924), as Harlow Rothert took silver. František Douda won Czechoslovakia's first shot put medal with a bronze.

Background

This was the ninth appearance of the event, which is one of 12 athletics events to have been held at every Summer Olympics. Bronze medalist Emil Hirschfeld of Germany was the only returning thrower from the 1928 Games. The top two throwers in 1932 were Leo Sexton and Bruce Bennett of the United States; Bennett failed to make the American team, however, leaving Sexton as the Olympic favorite. He faced strong challengers, however, as Hirschfeld, František Douda of Czechoslovakia, and Zygmunt Heljasz of Poland had taken turns as world record holder between 1928 and 1932.

Argentina, Poland, and South Africa each made their debut in the men's shot put. The United States appeared for the ninth time, the only nation to have competed in all Olympic shot put competitions to date.

Competition format

The competition continued to use the two-round format used in 1900 and since 1908, with results carrying over between rounds. Each athlete received three throws in the qualifying round. The top six men advanced to the final, where they received an additional three throws. The best result, qualifying or final, counted.

Records

These were the standing world and Olympic records (in metres) prior to the 1932 Summer Olympics.

Leo Sexton broke the Olympic record with a 15.940 metres throw in the fourth round before breaking it again with 16.005 metres in the final throw.

Schedule

Results

References

Men's shot put
Shot put at the Olympics
Men's events at the 1932 Summer Olympics